is a Japanese manga series written and illustrated by Yuki Urushibara. It was serialized in Kodansha's seinen manga magazine Monthly Afternoon from April 2018 to December 2020, with its chapters collected in three tankōbon volumes.

Publication
When a Cat Faces West, written and illustrated by Yuki Urushibara, was serialized in Kodansha's seinen manga magazine Monthly Afternoon from April 25, 2018, to December 25, 2020. Kodansha collected its chapters in three tankōbon volumes, released from February 22, 2019, to February 22, 2021.

In April 2022, Kodansha USA announced that they licensed the manga for English digital release in North America.

Volume list

References

Further reading

External links
 

Kodansha manga
Seinen manga
Slice of life anime and manga
Supernatural anime and manga